The 1828 United States presidential election in Illinois took place between October 31 and December 2, 1828, as part of the 1828 United States presidential election. Voters chose three representatives, or electors to the Electoral College, who voted for president and vice president.

Illinois voted for the Democratic candidate, Andrew Jackson, over the National Republican candidate, John Quincy Adams. Jackson won Illinois by a margin of 34.44%.

Results

See also
 United States presidential elections in Illinois

References

Illinois
1828
1828 Illinois elections